The 2022 Kwik Trip 250 was a NASCAR Cup Series race held on July 3, 2022, at Road America in Elkhart Lake, Wisconsin. Contested over 62 laps on the  road course, it was the 18th race of the 2022 NASCAR Cup Series season.

Report

Background

Road America is a motorsport road course located near Elkhart Lake, Wisconsin on Wisconsin Highway 67. It has hosted races since the 1950s and currently hosts races in the NASCAR Xfinity Series, IMSA WeatherTech SportsCar Championship, SCCA Pirelli World Challenge, ASRA, AMA Superbike series, IndyCar Series, and SCCA Pro Racing's Trans-Am Series.

On September 15, 2021, the track announced that Jockey and Kwik Trip would switch places in the race's sponsorship, with Kwik Trip becoming the title sponsor and Jockey becoming the presenting sponsor.

Entry list
 (R) denotes rookie driver.
 (i) denotes driver who is ineligible for series driver points.

Practice

Practice results

Qualifying

Qualifying results

Race

Stage Results

Stage One
Laps: 15

Stage Two
Laps: 15

Final Stage Results

Stage Three
Laps: 32

Race statistics
 Lead changes: 8 among 6 different drivers
 Cautions/Laps: 2 for 2
 Red flags: 0
 Time of race: 2 hours, 35 minutes and 51 seconds
 Average speed:

Media

Television
USA covered the race on the television side. Rick Allen, Jeff Burton, Steve Letarte, and Dale Earnhardt Jr. called the race from the broadcast booth. Kim Coon, Parker Kligerman and Marty Snider handled the pit road duties from pit lane. Rutledge Wood served as a “CityView” reporter and share stories from the track.

Radio
Radio coverage of the race was broadcast by Motor Racing Network (MRN) and was simulcast on Sirius XM NASCAR Radio.

Standings after the race

Drivers' Championship standings

Manufacturers' Championship standings

Note: Only the first 16 positions are included for the driver standings.
. – Driver has clinched a position in the NASCAR Cup Series playoffs.

EDIT: Denny Hamlin and Daniel Suarez both have wins at this point in the season. They have clinched positions in the playoffs, pushing Almirola and Harvick out.

References

Kwik Trip 250
NASCAR races at Road America
Kwik Trip 250
Kwik Trip 250